The cities with the largest French American populations are in Maine. However, in northern Maine, they are of Acadian ancestry, and in southern Maine and northern New Hampshire, of Canadian ancestry.

The cities are as follows:

See also
History of the French in Baltimore
History of the French in Louisville
French in Syracuse, New York

References

French American
 
European-American society
French diaspora by country